L&G may serve as an acronym for:

 Ladies & Gentlemen, the Tokyo bedding company at the centre of the Enten controversy
 Legal & General Group Plc, a multinational financial services company headquartered in the United Kingdom
 Leisure and Gaming, a defunct online gambling holding company